Gaiola is a comune (municipality) in the Province of Cuneo in the Italian region Piedmont, located about  southwest of Turin and about  southwest of Cuneo.

Gaiola borders the following municipalities: Borgo San Dalmazzo, Moiola, Rittana, Roccasparvera, and Valloriate.

References 

Cities and towns in Piedmont